Jaroslav Šilhavý (born 3 November 1961) is a Czech football manager and former player. He is the coach of Czech Republic.

As a player, Šilhavý made a total of 464 top flight appearances spanning the end of the Czechoslovak First League and the beginning of the Czech First League, scoring 25 goals. His 464 appearances was a Czech league record until 6 November 2022, when Šilhavý was surpassed by Milan Petržela with 465 appearances. His son, Tomáš Šilhavý, also played football in the Czech First League.

As a manager, Šilhavý won the 2011–12 Czech First League with FC Slovan Liberec. He has also had spells managing other top flight clubs in the Czech Republic, including Kladno, Viktoria Plzeň and Dynamo České Budějovice. He was an assistant manager for the Czech Republic national team from 2001 to 2009 before eventually taking full charge since 2018.

Club career
As a player, Šilhavý played as a defender. Born in Plzeň, he started playing at the top level in the 1979–80 Czechoslovak First League for TJ Škoda Plzeň. He subsequently played for ten years with RH Cheb before moving to Slavia Prague partway through the 1989–90 Czechoslovak First League.

At Slavia, Šilhavý was part of the team which finished second in the 1992–93 Czechoslovak First League but after four years in Prague, he moved to FC Petra Drnovice to continue his footballing career.

After three years at Drnovice, he moved back to Prague in 1997, this time to play for Viktoria Žižkov, where he served as club captain. While at Žižkov, he won the 1998 Personality of the League award at the Czech Footballer of the Year awards.

International career
Šilhavý played for the Czechoslovakia U21 national team for eight years, some of these as an authorised over-age player. In this time he made 18 appearances for his country.

Šilhavý represented Czechoslovakia four times as a player, making his debut against Finland on 29 August 1990. His final appearance for the full national side was on 27 March 1991, when he played eight minutes of a match against Poland. He also played one match, in 1992, for Czechoslovakia B.

Managerial career
Following his career as a player, Šilhavý became assistant manager to Zdeněk Ščasný at Viktoria Žižkov. He also joined the Czech national team set-up as a coach in December 2001, a position he continued to hold until April 2009. In December 2002 he joined Sparta Prague as assistant to manager Jiří Kotrba.

Šilhavý joined Czech First League side Kladno as manager in 2007, signing a one-year deal. Kladno subsequently finished 14th, one place above the relegation places, in the 2007–08 Czech First League.

In May 2008, Šilhavý was named as the new manager of Viktoria Plzeň, although his tenure only lasted nine matches, during which time the club won just once. He was relieved of his duties in October 2008.

He took up his post at Dynamo České Budějovice on 14 October 2009, replacing Pavel Tobiáš at the club, who were bottom of the league at that time. Budějovice finished the season in 13th place and avoided relegation. The following season, in the 2010–11 Czech First League, Šilhavý led České Budějovice to a final position of 11th in the league table.

In June 2011, Šilhavý was announced as the replacement for outgoing coach Petr Rada as manager of FC Slovan Liberec. Liberec started the season well, reaching second place in the league behind Sparta after seven games. The club finished the 2011–12 Czech First League in first place, winning the league and qualifying for the UEFA Champions League.

Šilhavý replaced Luboš Kozel as manager of FK Dukla Prague in May 2016, signing a three-year contract. He joined Slavia Prague in September of the same year.

Managerial statistics

Honours

Player
Slavia Prague
 Czechoslovak First League runner-up: 1992–93

Petra Drnovice
 Czech Cup runner-up: 1995–96

Managerial
Slovan Liberec
 Czech First League: 2011–12

FK Jablonec
 Czech Cup runner-up: 2014–15

Slavia Prague
 Czech First League: 2016–17

References

1961 births
Living people
Sportspeople from Plzeň
Czech footballers
Czechoslovak footballers
Czechoslovakia under-21 international footballers
Czechoslovakia international footballers
FC Viktoria Plzeň players
FK Hvězda Cheb players
SK Slavia Prague players
FK Drnovice players
FK Viktoria Žižkov players
Czech football managers
Czech First League managers
SK Kladno managers
FC Viktoria Plzeň managers
SK Dynamo České Budějovice managers
FK Jablonec managers
FC Slovan Liberec managers
SK Slavia Prague managers
Association football defenders
Czech Republic national football team managers
UEFA Euro 2020 managers
FK Dukla Prague managers